Smoke is a novel by bestselling author Lisa Unger writing as Lisa Miscione. It is the fourth and final book featuring Lydia Strong.

References

2005 American novels
American crime novels
Novels set in Florida
Novels by Lisa Unger
Minotaur Books books